Project 100,000, also known as McNamara's 100,000, McNamara's Folly, McNamara's Morons, and McNamara's Misfits, was a controversial 1960s program by the United States Department of Defense (DoD) to recruit soldiers who would previously have been below military mental or medical standards. Project 100,000 was initiated by Defense Secretary Robert McNamara in October 1966 to meet the escalating manpower requirements of the American government's involvement in the Vietnam War. According to Hamilton Gregory, author of the book McNamara's Folly: The Use of Low-IQ Troops in the Vietnam War, inductees of the project died at triple the rate of other Americans serving in Vietnam and following their service had lower incomes and higher rates of divorce than their non-veteran counterparts. The project was ended in December 1971 and has been the subject of controversy, especially during the manpower shortages of the Iraq War.

Background

At various times in its history, the United States Armed Forces has recruited people who measured below specific mental and medical standards. Those who scored in certain lower percentiles of mental aptitude tests were admitted into service during World War II, though this experience eventually led to a legal floor of IQ 80 to enlist. Another instance occurred in the 1980s due to a misinformed Armed Services Vocational Aptitude Battery.

By October 1966, monthly draft calls had been steadily increasing for 15 consecutive months and stood at 49,300, the highest since early 1951, the peak mobilization period of the Korean War, when 80,000 men a month were called up. In a series of decisions, the Pentagon lowered the required score to be inducted to as low as 10th percentile on the Armed Forces Qualification Test (perfect score: 99)—a 6% drop.

According to Hamilton Gregory, author of McNamara's Folly: The Use of Low-IQ Troops in the Vietnam War:

McNamara was a lover of technology... McNamara believed he could win the war in Vietnam through the use of advanced technology and computerized analysis... And he believed he could raise the intelligence of men through the use of video tapes.

Project
Promoted as a response to President Lyndon B. Johnson's War on Poverty by giving training and opportunity to the uneducated and poor, the recruited men were classified as “New Standards Men” (or, pejoratively, as the "Moron Corps"). They had scored in Category IV of the Armed Forces Qualification Test, which placed them in the 10th-30th percentile range. The number of soldiers reportedly recruited through the program varies, from more than 320,000 to 354,000, which included both voluntary enlistees and draftees (54% and 46%, respectively). Entrance requirements were loosened, but all the Project 100,000 men were sent through normal training programs with other recruits, and performance standards thus were the same for everyone. The US Army received 71% of recruits, followed by 10% by the Marines, 10% by the Navy, and 9% by the Air Force.

Project 100,000 soldiers included those unable to speak English, those who had low mental aptitude or minor physical impairments, and those who were slightly over- or underweight. They also included a special category made up of a control group of "normal" soldiers. Each of the different categories was identified in the soldiers' official personnel records by a large red letter stamped on the first page of their enlistment contracts. Human resources offices had to prepare reports on them, to be submitted monthly to the Department of the Army. The monthly reports did not disclose the identity of the soldiers.

Aftermath

While the project was promoted as a response to President Lyndon Johnson's War on Poverty, it has been an object of criticism.  Regarding the consequences of the program, a 1989 study sponsored by the DoD concluded:

A 1995 review by Myra MacPherson in the Washington Monthly of McNamara's book, In Retrospect: The Tragedy and Lessons of Vietnam, severely criticized the project, saying that "the program offered a one-way ticket to Vietnam, where these men fought and died in disproportionate numbers ... the men of the 'Moron Corps' provided the necessary cannon fodder to help evade the political horror of dropping student deferments or calling up the reserves, which were sanctuaries for the lily-white."

Project 100,000 was highlighted in a 2006 op-ed in The New York Times in which former Wesleyan assistant professor and then Tufts assistant professor Kelly M. Greenhill, writing in the context of a contemporary recruitment shortfall, concluded that "Project 100,000 was a failed experiment. It proved to be a distraction for the military and of little benefit to the men it was created to help." To explain the reason for veterans from the project faring worse in civilian life than their non-veteran peers, Greenhill hypothesized it might be related to the psychological consequences of combat or unpreparedness for the post-military transition.

See also
Disability draft
Intelligence and public policy
McNamara fallacy
Forrest Gump
Full Metal Jacket

References

Military history of the United States during the Vietnam War
United States Department of Defense